The women's singles was one of four events of the tennis program at the 2009 Games of the Small States of Europe in Cyprus.

Medalists

Seeds
 Mandy Minella (champion, gold medalist)
 Claudine Schaul (final, silver medalist)
 Marina Novak (semifinals, bronze medalist)
 Marilena Papadopoulou (first round)

Draw

References
 Women's Singles Draw

Women's singles